is a private university in Wakaba Ward of the city of Chiba, Chiba Prefecture, Japan. The university was established in 1988 by the School corporation Tokyo University of Agriculture. The university consists of four departments: Information System, Environmental Information, Business & Information, and Media & Cultural Studies.

External links
 Tokyo University of Information Sciences

Educational institutions established in 1988
Private universities and colleges in Japan
Universities and colleges in Chiba Prefecture
Engineering universities and colleges in Japan
1988 establishments in Japan